The 1982 Amílcar Cabral Cup was held in Praia, Cape Verde.

Group stage

Group A

Group B

Knockout stage

Semi-finals

Third place match

Final

References
RSSSF archives

Amílcar Cabral Cup